Charles E. Entenmann (1929 - February 24, 2022) was an American executive. He and his two brothers along with their mother ran Entenmann's bakery.

References

1929 births
2022 deaths
20th-century American businesspeople
21st-century American businesspeople